Growing Up Gay was a groundbreaking two-part documentary series broadcast on RTÉ One, which began on Monday 19 April 2010 at 9.35pm (after the main evening news). It explored the experiences of the first generation of lesbian, gay, bisexual and transgender (LGBT) people growing up in an Ireland where it was legal to be themselves. Filmed over 18 months, it was made by Crossing the Line Films with the ongoing support and advice of Ireland's national organisation for Lesbian, Gay, Biseuxal and Trans young people, BeLonG To. It featured LGBT school-goers, Muslims, and young people facing persecution in their hometowns across Ireland.

RTÉ courted controversy by recommending that the documentary be suitable for viewing by "mature audiences" only, despite its stars all being teenagers. There was also a delay in the appearance of the second episode on RTÉ player.

Growing Up Gay was nominated for "Event of the Year" at the GALAs (Gay and Lesbian Awards).

References

2010 in Irish television
LGBT-related controversies in television
LGBT-related controversies in Ireland
Irish documentary television series
Irish LGBT-related television shows
RTÉ controversies
Rating controversies in television
RTÉ original programming
2010s LGBT-related television series
Documentaries about LGBT topics